The Second Shadow Cabinet of Edward Heath was created after the Conservative Party lost the February 1974 general election. It was led by the Leader of the Conservative Party Edward Heath and featured prominent Conservative politicians both past and future. Included was Heath's successor Margaret Thatcher, the future Home Secretary William Whitelaw, and two future Foreign Secretaries, Lord Carrington and Francis Pym. For the first time in history, a leadership election was held in 1975 for the Conservative Party whilst the position was not vacant. Margaret Thatcher challenged Heath, with whom the majority of the party was dissatisfied because of repeated losses at elections. She won, becoming the first female leader of a major political party in Britain.

Shadow cabinet list

References

Further reading 
 Margaret Thatcher: The Authorized Biography Volume 1: Not For Turning by Charles Moore

Official Opposition (United Kingdom)
British shadow cabinets
1974 in British politics
1974 establishments in the United Kingdom
1975 disestablishments in the United Kingdom
Edward Heath